Robert Kipkorir Kipchumba (born 2 February 1984 in Kaptul, Marakwet District) is a Kenyan long-distance track, and road running athlete.

Biography
He started running while at Hossen Primary School. Kipchumba won the junior race at the 2000 World Cross Country Championships in Vilamoura finishing in 22:49. Later that year in Santiago de Chile he won the gold medal at the 2000 World Junior Championships in Athletics when he finished the 10,000 m in 28:54.37. In 2001 and 2002 his running was hampered by injuries. He was recruited by Kenyan Army in 2002. He won the Stramilano half marathon in 2004.

On 8 October 2006 he won the silver medal at the World Road Running Championships. He set a Kenyan national record of 56:41 minutes for the 20 km distance. He won the Lisbon Half Marathon in 2007 with a time of 1:00.31.

He made his marathon debut at the 2009 Rotterdam Marathon, finishing eighth and setting a time of 2:09:54 hours. He won the 2011 Xiamen Marathon with a course record of 2:08:07, in spite of poor weather conditions. His second race of the year came at the Lisbon Half Marathon in March and he came fourth in the fast-paced race.

He is managed by Gianni Demadonna and coached by Renato Canova. Kipchumba has a  farm in Trans-Nzoia District. He is married with two children (as of 2004).

References

External links

"Focus on Athletes" article from IAAF

1984 births
Living people
People from Elgeyo-Marakwet County
Kenyan male long-distance runners
Kenyan male marathon runners
Kenyan male cross country runners